Kelsey Michelle Griffin (born July 2, 1987) is an American-Australian professional women's basketball player. She was drafted 3rd overall in the 2010 WNBA Draft. Griffin played college basketball with the Nebraska Cornhuskers. Griffin was named to many All-America teams and was the winner of the Lowe's Senior CLASS Award. Griffin is currently playing for the University of Canberra Capitals in the Australian WNBL. Having obtained Australian citizenship in November 2015, Griffin pledged her allegiance to Australia before the 2016 Summer Olympics in Rio de Janeiro.

Early life
Griffin was born at Providence Hospital in Anchorage, Alaska on July 2, 1987, to Jim and Jan Griffin. Growing up mostly in nearby Eagle River, Griffin attended Chugiak High School.

College
Griffin attended Nebraska for five years. She injured an ankle in the summer of 2008. After not being able to practice for 14 weeks, the decision was made to opt for surgery, so she miss the entire 2008–2009 season and was granted a redshirt season.

Nebraska statistics
Source

Professional career

WNBA
The Minnesota Lynx had the third pick of the 2010 draft and selected Griffin. As she was about to pose for a picture with a Lynx jersey and WNBA President Donna Orender, she was traded to the Connecticut Sun for future draft picks.
In her rookie season for the Sun, Griffin averaged 4.4 points and 4.7 rebounds and was able to earn a spot on the WNBA All Rookie Team.

Europe
Griffin played for Pécs 2010, a professional basketball team in Pécs, Hungary, playing in the Hungarian A league, one of the premier leagues in EuroBasketball. She led the team to a 23–1 record, which earned an entry in the championship series.

Australia

Griffin signed with the Bendigo Spirit for the 2012/13 Australian Women's National Basketball League (WNBL). Due to WNBA commitments, Griffin did not join the Spirit until six rounds into the season. Once cleared to play, she made an instant impact for Bendigo, averaging 16.5 points, 8.6 rebounds per game. Griffin was instrumental in Bendigo's WNBL championship victory, claiming grand final MVP honours after scoring 20 points and collecting 11 rebounds. Despite missing close to a third of the season, Griffin finished sixth overall in the WNBL's end of season league MVP voting.

Awards and honors
2010—Lowe's Senior CLASS Award
2010—WBCA First-Team All-American
2010—AP First-Team All-American
2010—USBWA First-Team All-American
2010—Wooden First-Team All-American
2010—Big 12 Player of the Year
2013—WNBL Grand Final Most Valuable Player
2013—WNBL Champion
2014—WNBL Grand Final Most Valuable Player
2014—WNBL Champion
2019—WNBL Grand Final Most Valuable Player
2019—WNBL Champion
2019—WNBL MVP

References

External links
 Profile

1987 births
Living people
All-American college women's basketball players
American emigrants to Australia
American expatriate basketball people in Australia
American expatriate basketball people in Hungary
American expatriate basketball people in Israel
American women's basketball players
Australian women's basketball players
Basketball players at the 2018 Commonwealth Games
Basketball players from Alaska
Bendigo Spirit players
Commonwealth Games gold medallists for Australia
Commonwealth Games medallists in basketball
Connecticut Sun players
Forwards (basketball)
Minnesota Lynx draft picks
Naturalised citizens of Australia
Nebraska Cornhuskers women's basketball players
Sportspeople from Anchorage, Alaska
Medallists at the 2018 Commonwealth Games